Dr. Walter Altherr, CDU
 Peter Anheuser, CDU 
 Christian Johannes Baldauf, CDU
 Hans-Artur Bauckhage, FDP
 Christine Baumann, SPD 
 Kurt Beck, SPD 
 Michael Billen, CDU
 Franz Josef Bischel, CDU 
 Christoph Böhr, CDU 
 Hans-Josef Bracht, CDU 
 Dr. Bernhard Braun, BÜNDNIS 90/DIE GRÜNEN 
 Ulla Brede-Hoffmann, SPD 
 Brinkmann, Ernst-Günter  SPD 
 Burgard, Dieter  SPD 
 Creutzmann, Jürgen  FDP 
 Dröscher, Peter Wilhelm SPD 
 Ebli, Friederike SPD 
 Elsner, Petra SPD 
 Enders, Dr. Peter CDU
 Ernst, Guido Karl  CDU
 Fink, Monika  SPD
 Franzmann, Rudolf  SPD
 Frisch, Lutz  CDU 
 Fuhr, Alexander  SPD 
 Gebhart, Dr. Thomas CDU 
 Geis, Manfred  SPD 
 Geisen, Dr. Edmund   FDP
 Gölter, Dr. Georg  CDU 
 Christoph Grimm, SPD 
 Marianne Grosse, SPD 
 Friedel Grützmacher, BÜNDNIS 90/DIE GRÜNEN 
 Helga Hammer, CDU 
 Klaus Hammer, SPD 
 Hartloff, Jochen  SPD 
 Heinrich, Heribert  SPD 
 Hohn, Reinhold  FDP
 Hörter, Michael  CDU 
 Huth-Haage, Simone CDU
 Itzek, Gerd  SPD 
 Jullien, Herbert  CDU 
 Keller, Josef  CDU 
 Elke Kiltz, BÜNDNIS 90/DIE GRÜNEN 
 Kipp, Anne  SPD 
 Klamm, Hannelore  SPD 
 Klöckner, Dieter SPD 
 Kohnle-Gros, Marlies  CDU 
 Werner Kuhn, FDP 
 Lammert, Matthias  CDU 
 Lelle, Erhard  CDU 
 Leppla, Ruth SPD 
 Lewentz, Roger  SPD 
 Licht, Alexander  CDU 
 Mangold-Wegner, Sigrid  SPD 
 Reiner Marz, BÜNDNIS 90/DIE GRÜNEN 
 Joachim Mertes, SPD
 Herbert Mertin, FDP 
 Elfriede Meurer, CDU
 Gernot Mittler, SPD 
 Norbert Mittrücker, CDU
 Margit Mohr, SPD 
 Nicole Morsblech, FDP
 Manfred Nink, SPD 
 Hans Jürgen Noss, SPD 
 Renate Pepper, SPD
 Pörksen, Carsten  SPD 
 Presl, Fritz  SPD 
 Puchtler, Frank, SPD
 Raab, Heike, SPD 
 Ramsauer, Günther, SPD 
 Reich, Beate, SPD 
 Remy, Sigurd, SPD 
 Rösch, Günter, SPD 
 Rosenbauer, Dr. Josef, CDU 
 Rüddel, Erwin, CDU 
 Schäfer, Dorothea CDU
 Schiffmann, Dr. Dieter  SPD 
 Schleicher-Rothmund, Barbara  SPD 
 Schmidt, Dr. Gerhard  SPD
 Schmidt, Ulla  CDU 
 Schmitt, Astrid  SPD 
 Schmitt, Dieter  CDU 
 Schmitz, Dr. Peter  FDP 
 Schnabel, Heinz-Hermann  CDU 
 Schneider, Christine  CDU 
 Schneider-Forst, Angela Maria  CDU 
 Schneiders, Herbert  CDU 
 Schreiner, Gerd  CDU 
 Schwarz, Franz  SPD 
 Schweitzer, Harald  SPD 
 Seiler, Ulrich  SPD 
 Siegrist, Hildrun  SPD 
 Spurzem, Anne  SPD 
 Stretz, Norbert  SPD 
 Thelen, Hedi CDU 
 Ise Thomas, BÜNDNIS 90/DIE GRÜNEN 
 Dr. Adolf Weiland, CDU
 Mathilde Weinandy,  CDU 
 Thomas Weiner, CDU
 Nils Wiechmann, BÜNDNIS 90/DIE GRÜNEN 
 Walter Wirz, CDU 
 F. Walter Zuber, SPD

See also
Landtag of Rhineland-Palatinate

References
Official website of the Rhineland-Palatinate Landtag

Rhineland-Palatinate, Landtag

Politics of Rhineland-Palatinate